Dal Varešanović (born 23 May 2001) is a Bosnian professional footballer who plays as an attacking midfielder for Bosnian Premier League club Sarajevo.

Club career
Varešanović made his senior debut for Sarajevo in the Bosnian Premier League on 21 March 2021, scoring in his debut against Krupa in a 1–0 win. He won his first trophy with the club on 26 May 2021, after beating Borac Banja Luka in the 2020–21 Bosnian Cup final.

International career
Varešanović represented Bosnia and Herzegovina on various youth levels.

Personal life
Varešanović comes from a footballing family. His father, Mirza Varešanović, earned over 20 caps for Bosnia and Herzegovina. His grandfather Mirsad Fazlagić captained Yugoslavia at UEFA Euro 1968, while his brother Mak also plays professionally.

Honours
Sarajevo 
Bosnian Cup: 2020–21

References

External links

2001 births
Living people
Footballers from Sarajevo
Association football midfielders
Bosnia and Herzegovina footballers
Bosnia and Herzegovina youth international footballers
GNK Dinamo Zagreb players
Liverpool F.C. players
FK Sarajevo players
Premier League of Bosnia and Herzegovina players
Bosnia and Herzegovina expatriate footballers
Expatriate footballers in Croatia
Expatriate footballers in England
Bosnia and Herzegovina expatriate sportspeople in Croatia
Bosnia and Herzegovina expatriate sportspeople in England